Eric Malling (September 4, 1946 – September 28, 1998) was a Canadian television journalist.

Born in Swift Current, Saskatchewan to Danish immigrant John Malling Sorensen. Malling was the only son of a butcher. He graduated from the University of Saskatchewan with a BA degree in English literature, then continued his studies at Carleton University in Ottawa where he graduated from the School of Journalism.

Career
Eric Malling was a hard-hitting investigative journalist. Malling initially worked for the provincial government. He then worked as a journalist for the Regina Leader-Post and Swift Current Sun. He followed this by working at The Toronto Star beginning in 1968.  From 1976 to 1990, he was the host of the CBC's the fifth estate. In 1978, his one-hour documentary on Gerald Bull and his role in the illegal export of artillery shells from Canada to South Africa during apartheid brought wide acclaim. In another of many sensational stories, the Federal Minister responsible for Fisheries, John Fraser had to resign after Malling revealed he had overruled his own health inspectors and allowed the sale of tainted StarKist brand of tuna based on the suggestion by a non-government corporation.

In 1990, he moved to CTV to host W5, which during this period was known as W5 with Eric Malling. In 1995, Malling moved from hosting W5 to hosting Mavericks, a television program that explored controversial political figures and was also produced by CTV.

His television journalism earned him a Gemini Award, six ACTRA Awards, three Gordon Sinclair awards for excellence in broadcast journalism.  He also received two Centre for Investigative Journalism Awards for excellence in investigative journalism. 

Malling died at Sunnybrook Hospital in Toronto.  He was 52 years of age.

References

1946 births
1998 deaths
Canadian television reporters and correspondents
People from Swift Current
Journalists from Saskatchewan
Journalists from Toronto
University of Saskatchewan alumni
Carleton University alumni
Canadian people of Danish descent
CBC Television people
CTV Television Network people
Canadian Screen Award winning journalists
20th-century Canadian journalists
Centre for Investigative Journalism Award winners